C tuning is a type of guitar tuning. The strings of the guitar are tuned two whole steps lower than standard tuning. The resulting notes can be described most commonly as C-F-A♯-D♯-G-C or C-F-B♭-E♭-G-C. This is not to be confused with C tuning, which is one and one half steps lower than standard tuning.

The tuning is commonly used by metal and hard rock artists to achieve a heavier, deeper sound. Slackening regular strings on a regular guitar to a lower pitch makes bending easier. Depending on personal playing style, some guitarists find this desirable, while others switch to heavier-gauge strings to avoid unintentional bending and to play chords in tune more easily. Another option is the use of a baritone guitar, which is built slightly longer and stronger than a regular guitar to achieve the desired pitch with heavy strings at average tensions.

Used by
Abysmal Dawn
The Absence
Acid Bath
Akercocke
Alestorm
Al-Namrood
Amaranthe (this tuning and drop B-flat used on their first two studio albums)
Amatory
Amon Amarth (on the albums Sorrow Throughout the Nine Worlds, Once Sent from the Golden Hall, and their new album Berserker along with drop B-flat)
Anaal Nathrakh
Ani Di Franco
Anathema (on their recent progressive rock albums)
Arch Enemy (2001–present)
Avatar (on the first three studio albums)
Autopsy 
Behemoth
Black Sabbath (on live performances of most songs from Master of Reality and Vol. 4 since 2012, including "Into the Void", "Under the Sun", and "Snowblind") 
Blasphemy
Blut Aus Nord
Bolt Thrower (on their debut album In Battle There Is No Law!)
Brendon Small
BroodMother
Burnt By The Sun
Called To Arms
Cancerslug
Chthonic
Chuck Berry (most notable songs were recorded in standard tuning)
Cold
Colour Haze
Cradle of Filth (In "Better to Reign in Hell" from Damnation and a Day)
DarkWrench
Dawn Of Demise
Deadlock
Death (metal band) (1985)
Deathstars
Defeated Sanity
Dethklok
Devourment
Die Apokalyptischen Reiter
Dimension Zero
Disgorge 
Dismember
Dissection
Dream Theater (used on "As I Am", "Honor Thy Father" and "In the Name of God" on Train of Thought, "A Nightmare to Remember" on Black Clouds & Silver Linings, and "Untethered Angel" on Distance over Time)
Entombed (From Clandestine onward)
Elder (On debut album only)
Electric Wizard
Epica (on most songs from Consign to Oblivion)
Evanescence on some songs
EyeHateGod
Fight (band)
From The Vastland
Full of Hell
George Cromarty
George Ezra
Goat Horn
Gorguts (since Obscura)
Grand Magus
Guía Luz Negra (d bandolier)
Hamlet (main tuning)
Harvey Milk 
Hatebreed
Hatesphere
Heaven Shall Burn
High on Fire
Hypocrisy (from Penetralia to The Final Chapter)
Immolation
Incantation
In Flames(since The Jester Race; after Reroute to Remain, they started using drop A# exclusively)
Into Eternity 
Jimi Hendrix (In the song "Here My Train A' Comin' (Acoustic)")
John Butler
Judas Priest (on "Dead Meat", "Brain Dead", and "Cathedral Spires")
Katatonia (all albums since Viva Emptiness)
Kip Winger (solo)
Kittie
Kyuss
Kreator
Kuthah
Legion Of The Damned
Life of Agony (on half of “Ugly”, the entirety of “Soul Searching Sun”, and some songs from "The Sound of Scars")
Licuation
Monster Magnet
Murder by Death
NAILS
Necrophagia
Nervosa
Neuraxis
Nick Drake
Nightrage
Noah And The Whale
Panopticon
Paradise Lost (first two albums)
Parasite Inc.
Pile
Porcupine Tree (in Anesthetize and Way Out of Here)
Punch the Klown
Queens of the Stone Age (used exclusively on their debut album, after which C standard, E standard and various other tunings were used)
Royal Blood (How Did We Get So Dark?)
Salticid (in "Black Fly")
Scorpions (on "Love 'em or Leave 'em")
Scythrow
Sentenced (on their first album Shadows of the Past)
Septicflesh (in a few earlier songs, and in much of their recent symphonic death metal material)
Sepultura (on "Antichrist" and "Necromancer")
Six Feet Under
Sleep
Suffocation (on Effigy of the Forgotten)
The Black Dahlia Murder
The Smashing Pumpkins (in "The Everlasting Gaze" "Lucky 13" "Heavy Metal Machine" and "The Imploding Voice")
The Sword
Sibylle Baier
Sodom (in "Masquerade in Blood")
Soundgarden (occasionally on other releases)
Spectrum Disorder
Spiritual Beggars
Starkill
Static-X (all up until Shadow Zone – since then, they drop the low string to Bb)  
Strapping Young Lad
Suidakra
Tal Wilkenfeld  (open C# in Pieces of Me, among others)
Therion (on their early death metal albums)
Tiamat (on their first album Sumerian Cry)
Tony Iommi (on the song "Who's Fooling Who") 
Tremonti (on the songs "Arm Yourself", "Throw Them to the Lions" (performed in B tuning live), and "Make it Hurt")
While Heaven Wept
The Wildhearts (on 2009's "Chutzpah" album)
Witchfinder General
Wolfchant

References 

Guitar tunings